Bad to the Bone is the fifth studio album by American blues rock band George Thorogood and the Destroyers. It was released in 1982 by the label EMI America Records and contains their best known song, "Bad to the Bone". The album features Rolling Stones side-man Ian Stewart on keyboards. A special edition was released in 2007 to mark the 25th anniversary of its original release.

Reception
AllMusic's Tim Sendra says the album is "Thorogood's finest work and established him as one of the unsung heroes of the age of AOR".

Track listing 
 "Back to Wentzville" (George Thorogood) – 3:30
 "Blue Highway" (Nick Gravenites, David Getz) – 4:44
 "Nobody but Me" (The Isley Brothers) – 3:28
 "I Know It's a Sin" (Jimmy Reed) – 3:32
 "New Boogie Chillun" (John Lee Hooker) – 5:03
 "Bad to the Bone" (Thorogood) – 4:52
 "Miss Luann" (Thorogood) – 4:13
 "As the Years Go Passing By" (Deadric Malone) – 5:03
 "No Particular Place to Go" (Chuck Berry) – 4:00
 "Wanted Man" (Bob Dylan) – 3:12

25th Anniversary edition bonus tracks

 "That Philly Thing" (George Thorogood) – 2:25
 "Blue Highway" (Nick Gravenites, David Getz) – 4:08
 "New Boogie Chillun" (John Lee Hooker) – 7:10
 "No Particular Place to Go" (Chuck Berry) – 4:26
 "As the Years Go Passing By" (Deadric Malone) – 4:44
 "Bad to the Bone" (Thorogood) – 7:05
 "Wanted Man" (Bob Dylan) – 3:57

Track 11 was an instrumental B-side, and Tracks 12-17 are 2007 re-recordings.

Personnel 
Musicians
 George Thorogood – vocals and guitars
 Hank Carter – saxophone
 Billy Blough – bass
 Jeff Simon – drums and percussions

 Additional musicians
 Ian Stewart – piano
Technical
 The Delaware Destroyers – producers
 John Nagy – assistant producer and engineer
 Ken Irwin – assistant producer
 Paul Mufson – engineer

Charts

References 

George Thorogood albums
1982 albums
EMI America Records albums